"Take Good Care of My Baby" is a song written by Carole King and Gerry Goffin. The song was made famous by Bobby Vee, when it was released in 1961.

Bobby Vee versions
While searching for material for Bobby Vee to record, Vee's producer Snuff Garrett heard a demo of Carole King singing "Take Good Care of My Baby". Garrett told publisher Don Kirshner that he wanted the song for Vee, but he believed the song needed an introductory verse. Garrett met with Carole King, and the introductory verse of Vee's version was written.

Among the musicians on the record were Barney Kessel, Tommy Allsup, and Howard Roberts on guitar, Clifford Hills on bass, Robert Florence on piano, and Earl Palmer on drums, while Sid Sharp did the string arrangements. The Johnny Mann Singers sang backup.

Bobby Vee released "Take Good Care of My Baby" as a single on July 20, 1961, and it was reviewed by Billboard in its issue dated July 31, 1961. Vee's recording quickly became popular, spending 15 weeks on the U.S. Billboard Hot 100, reaching No. 1 on September 18, 1961, and spending three weeks in that position. The song became a major hit internationally as well, reaching No. 1 in Canada, New Zealand, and the United Kingdom.

The song was ranked No. 12 on Billboards "Hot 100 for 1961 – Top Sides of the Year" and No. 23 on Cash Boxs "Top 100 Chart Hits of 1961".

The song was the lead track on Bobby Vee's album, Take Good Care of My Baby, which was released in 1962.

Vee re-recorded the song as a ballad in 1972. He released under his real name, Robert Thomas Velline, on his 1972 album Ain't Nothing Like a Sunny Day, and as a single in 1973. However, it is his original version, along with Bobby Vinton's, that remain as staples of oldies radio stations.

Chart performance

Bobby Vinton version

In 1968, the song was released by Bobby Vinton as a single and on his album, Take Good Care of My Baby. Vinton's version became a hit, spending 8 weeks on the U.S. Billboard Hot 100, reaching No. 33, while reaching No. 14 on Billboards Easy Listening chart, No. 19 on Record Worlds "100 Top Pops", No. 12 on Record Worlds "Top Non-Rock" chart, No. 36 on Canada's "RPM 100", and No. 16 on Canada's CHUM Hit Parade. Vinton's version omitted the introduction, plus the first two lines of the repeated refrain.

Chart performance

Smokie version 

In 1980, Smokie released a version of the song, which spent seven weeks on the UK Singles Chart, reaching No. 34, while reaching No. 10 on Austria's Ö3 Hit wähl mit chart, No. 15 on the Irish Singles Chart, and No. 18 in West Germany. It was later released on their 1981 album Solid Ground.

Other versions
Dion recorded a version of the song, which was released on his November 1961 album Runaround Sue. Although Dion's version was released after Bobby Vee's version, Dion's was the first version to be recorded.

The song was covered by The Beatles during their audition at Decca Records on January 1, 1962, with George Harrison on lead vocals. Gary Lewis & The Playboys recorded a cover version, which was released on their 1966 album, She's Just My Style.

Donny Osmond released a version of the song on his 1972 album Too Young.

As Dick Brave and the Backbeats, German pop star Sasha released a version in 2003, which reached No. 21 in Germany and No. 52 on the Ö3 Austria Top 40.

Answer songs
An answer song, titled "I'll Take Good Care of Your Baby", was recorded by Ralph Emery. It was released as a single on Liberty F-55383, in 1961. Another answer song, titled "You Should Know I'm Still Your Baby", was recorded by Sammi Lynn. It was released as a single on Sue Records 45-752, in 1961.

Notes

References

1961 singles
1968 singles
1973 singles
1980 singles
1961 songs
Bobby Vee songs
Dion DiMucci songs
Bobby Vinton songs
The Beatles songs
Smokie (band) songs
Billboard Hot 100 number-one singles
Cashbox number-one singles
Number-one singles in Canada
Number-one singles in New Zealand
Songs with lyrics by Gerry Goffin
Songs written by Carole King
Song recordings produced by Snuff Garrett
Song recordings produced by Billy Sherrill
Liberty Records singles
Epic Records singles
United Artists Records singles
RAK Records singles